Masuda M Rashid Chowdhury (22 July 1951 – 13 September 2021) was a Jatiya Party (Ershad) politician and a Jatiya Sangsad member from a reserved seat during 2019–2021.

Career
Chowdhury was a faculty member at the  department of sociology of the University of Dhaka. She was elected to the parliament from a reserved seat as a Jatiya Party (Ershad) candidate in February 2019. In June, the then chairperson of the party, Hussain Muhammad Ershad had temporarily suspended her from the party which was reinstated two months later by the new chairperson GM Quader.

Personal life 
Chowdhury was married to A.B.M. Fazle Rashid Chowdhury Hiru, son of AKM Fazlul Kabir Chowdhury.

Death 
Chowdhury died on 13 September 2021 at the age of 70 at the BIRDEM hospital in Dhaka.

References 

1951 births
2021 deaths
People from Chittagong
Academic staff of the University of Dhaka
Bangladesh Jatiya Party politicians
11th Jatiya Sangsad members
Women members of the Jatiya Sangsad
21st-century Bangladeshi women politicians
21st-century Bangladeshi politicians
Jatiya Party politicians